The 26th Rifle Division was a rifle division in the Soviet Red Army during the Russian Civil War, World War II and the Cold War. The division was formed on 3 November 1918 on the Eastern Front (China Border), sent to the Soviet-German Front in August 1941. Ended the war in Poland, where it was assigned to the Northern Group of Forces. It was disbanded in 1952.

Russian Civil War
The division was formed on the Eastern Front in November 1918. It fought the entire civil war period on the eastern front and ended the war on the Chinese border. The division remained there until 1929 when it moved to the coastal region.

Composition
76th Rifle Regiment
77th Rifle Regiment
78th Rifle Regiment
26th Artillery Regiment

World War II
Assigned to the 1st Red Banner Army at the start of the World War II, the division was ordered west in August 1941. Assigned to the Northwestern Front's 11th Army upon arrival. The division spent 1942 through September 1944 assigned to Northwestern or 2nd Baltic Fronts 11th, 27th, 34th, 1st Shock, and 22nd Armies. During this time the division took part in the Demyansk Army Group Offensive Operation (1st Phase) from 7 January to 20 May 1942 and second phase from 15 to 28 February 1943. It also fought in the Leningrad-Novgorod Strategic Offensive's Staraya Russa-Novorzhev Offensive from 18 February 1944 to 1 March 1944.

In September 1944 the division was reassigned to the 43rd Army's 90th Rifle Corps of the 1st Baltic Front. The army was reassigned to the 3rd Belorussian Front in January 1945 where it remained assigned for the remainder of the war. In the last part of the war the division participated in the Baltic Strategic Offensive's Riga Army Group Offensive from 14 September to 24 October 1944 and the East Prussian Offensive's Insterburg–Königsberg Offensive, Königsberg Offensive, and Zemland Offensive.

Composition
87th Rifle Regiment (formerly the 76th Rifle Regiment)
312th Rifle Regiment (formerly the 77th Rifle Regiment) (awarded the Honorific Designation “Novgorod”)
349th Rifle Regiment (formerly the 78th Rifle Regiment)
19th Artillery Regiment (formerly the 26th Artillery Regiment)
62nd Separate Antitank Artillery Battalion
459th Mortar Regiment (from 27.10.1941 to 19.10.1942)
67th Reconnaissance Company
9th Sapper Battalion
70th Separate Signals Battalion (formally 820th Sep. Signals Company)
30th Medical Battalion
29th Decontamination Company
52nd Auto-Transport Company (formally 150th and 479th Auto-Transport Company)
78th Field Bakery
59th Veterinary Field Hospital (formally 196th Veterinary Field Hospital)
20th Divisional Artillery Workshop Battalion
171st Field Postal Station (formally 8812th Field Postal Station)
261st Field Cash Office of the State Bank

Post war
The division was assigned to the Northern Group of Forces after the war and remained in Poland. In June 1946 it became part of the 132nd Rifle Corps, replacing the disbanded 18th Rifle Division. It  became part of the 18th Rifle Corps and was based at Wrocław between 1946 and 1948. The division disbanded along with its corps in 1952.

Commanders
 Mikhail Matiyasevich (3.11.1918 — 26.03.1919)
 Yan Gaylit (26.03.1919 — 16.04.1919)
 Genrich Eiche (16.04.1919 — 10.08.1919)
 S. M. Beliitsky (10.08.1919 - 8.09.1919)
 I. F. Blazevich (8.09.1919 - 10.09.1919), acting
 S. M. Beliitsky (10.09.1919 - 21.09.1919)
 Genrich Eiche (21.09.1919 - 23.11.1919)
 A. M. Volpe (23.11.1919 - 25.11.1919), acting
 Yan Gaylit (25.11.1919 - 26.10.1921)
Pyotr Filatov (November 1925–February 1927)

 Konstantin Pashkovsky (1929-1931)
 Grigory Iusstinovich (1931-1937)
 Nikolai Glovatsky (1937-1938)

Colonel Pavel Gregorevich Kuznetsov, 14 April 1941 - 22 February 1943
Colonel Kornily Cherepanov, 23 February 1943 - 25 September 1944
General-major Vasilii Andreevich Belonogov, 26 September 1944 - 21 April 1945
Colonel Nikolai Ivanovich Krasnov, 22 April 1945 - 9 May 1945

References

Sources
 
 

026
026
Military units and formations established in 1919
Military units and formations disestablished in 1952